Reinhold Sadler (January 10, 1848January 30, 1906) was an American politician. He was the ninth governor of Nevada. He was a member of the Silver Party.

Biography
Sadler was born on January 10, 1848, in Czarnikau, Posen Province, Prussia (modern-day Czarnków, Wielkopolska Province, Poland). His education was limited to the common schools of his native country. He immigrated to the United States first moving to Virginia City, and later Eureka. He married Louise Zadow in Hamilton, Nevada on May 26, 1874, and the couple had six children, Wihlemina, William Arthur, Bertha, Edgar, Alfred and Clarence.

Career
Sadler settled in Eureka, Nevada and worked as a miner, a miller, and a merchant. He was elected treasurer of Eureka County in 1880.

After two unsuccessful campaigns for state offices, he was elected the tenth lieutenant governor of Nevada in 1895. After the death of Governor John E. Jones, Sadler became Acting Governor, making him only the third foreign-born governor of Nevada,; he was elected Governor in his own right in 1898. During his tenure, the Farmer's Institute was launched and the State Board of Assessors was established.

After finishing out his term Sadler returned to Eureka, and resumed his various business enterprises. He was a Stalwart Silver candidate for U.S. Representative at large in 1904, but was not successful.

Death
Sadler died in Eureka on January 30, 1906, at the age of 58. He is interred at Lone Mountain Cemetery, Carson City, Nevada.

See also
List of U.S. state governors born outside the United States

References

Further reading

External links
 
 Biography
National Governors Association
The Political Graveyard
Nevada's First Ladies

1848 births
1906 deaths
Prussian emigrants to the United States
Governors of Nevada
Lieutenant Governors of Nevada
People from Czarnków
People from the Province of Posen
Silver Party politicians
Silver Party state governors of the United States
Democratic Party governors of Nevada
Nevada Silverites
People from Eureka, Nevada